Appleby's Methodist Church is a historic Methodist church located near St. George, Dorchester County, South Carolina. It was probably built about 1840–1850, and is a one-story, wooden meeting house in the Greek Revival style. The building is clapboard and the medium gable roof is covered with asphalt shingles. Also on the property is a contributing late 19th-century cemetery.

It was built in 1840 and added to the National Register in 1978.

References

Methodist churches in South Carolina
Churches on the National Register of Historic Places in South Carolina
Churches completed in 1845
19th-century Methodist church buildings in the United States
Greek Revival church buildings in South Carolina
Churches in Dorchester County, South Carolina
National Register of Historic Places in Dorchester County, South Carolina
Wooden churches in South Carolina